Lisa is a 1978 Indian Malayalam-language horror film directed by Baby (A. G. Baby) and produced by Dhanya Productions. Considered one of the best horror and musical flicks in Malayalam, with music by K. J. Joy.It was remade as Woh Phir Aayegi in Hindi. The film was a major commercial success running for 100-days in theatres.

Plot
Lakshmi is a young village girl who gets a job in a town. So she gets an accommodation at a working women's hostel. Here she befriends Kala who happens to be her roommate. Eventually she befriends other women in the hostel as well. It is then revealed that Lakshmi is a complete introvert who is shy and does not involve herself in any co-curricular activities such as dance, music, arts etc.

Things go well until one night, Lakshmi experiences strange activities in her room. Eventually, she is attacked by an unknown force. Since that incident, there are drastic changes in Lakshmi's behaviour. She starts behaving like a modern girl, wearing modern clothes and also taking part in the hostel's functions such as dance etc. This worries Kala, because Lakshmi's present behaviour was very much similar to her friend, Elizabeth or better known as Lisa, who died in a freak accident. Lakshmi's fiancé, Murali, is also confused by her behaviour because she rarely talked to him as before and instead spent more time with a man named Johnny, who was a singer. Moreover, Johnny used to be Lisa's boyfriend. Devastated by his girlfriend's death, he never looked upon any other girl.

Things take a toll when the hostel's former warden and Lakshmi's boss's colleague are murdered. Despite the absence of concrete evidences, Suresh, a police officer and Kala's fiancé, doubts that Lakshmi may have been involved in the murders.

In the end, Lakshmi transforms into a demon like figure and supernatural events take place around her. Soon, an exorcist is called to perform an exorcism on Lakshmi. When the exorcist enquires about the spirit's identity, it is revealed that Lakshmi is possessed by the spirit of Lisa. She revealed that she was an orphan, who was raised in an orphanage. Eventually, she got a job. While she was working, she had fallen in love with Johnny, who was impressed about her dancing skills. Johnny also reciprocates her feelings and the two plan to get married. But her fate took a turn when the former hostel warden was bribed by Lisa's boss's colleague to call Lisa over his hotel room and engage in sex with her. Lisa is infuriated after knowing about the ploy. In response, the colleague tries to molest her, but Lisa manages to get away from his grip. To get away from his clutches again, Lisa jumps out of the hotel's high rise window and dies due to the fall. Since then she wanted to take revenge on those responsible for her death. The exorcist then firmly tells that since she had her fill, she was supposed to leave her host's body. She responds without any hesitation and finally leaves Lakshmi's body.

Soon, Lakshmi is brought back to consciousness and reunites with Murali. Court frees Lakshmi from the murders, citing it to be a behaviour that science doesn't have an answer. In the meantime, Lisa causes Johnny an accident that cost his life. In this way, both Lisa and Johnny reunite and remain together forever in heaven.

Cast
 
Prem Nazir as Murali
Bhavani as P. Lakshmi
Seema as Lisa
Jayan as Suresh
Vanchiyoor Radha 
Vidhubala as Kala
Jayabharathi as herself (cameo)
Jose Prakash as Joseph Chacko, colleague
Prathapachandran as Lakshmi's father
Philomina as Lakshmi's mother
Kanakadurga as former hostel warden
Kuthiravattam Pappu as Gopalan, hostel watchman
M. G. Soman as Lakshmi's boss
Nellikode Bhaskaran 
Premji 
Ravikumar as Johnny
Kothuku Nanappan as Sankunni

Soundtrack
The music was composed by K. J. Joy and the lyrics were written by Vijayan.

Sequel
The film was very popular resulting in another film Veendum Lisa in 1987 also directed by Baby.

See also
List of Malayalam horror films

References

External links

Malayalasangeetham - Lisa film page

1978 films
1970s Malayalam-language films
1978 horror films
Indian horror films
Films shot in Kozhikode
Lisa1
Films directed by Baby (director)
Malayalam films remade in other languages